Herbert "Bert" Oldershaw (November 10, 1921 in Toronto – March 28, 2006 in Burlington, Ontario) was a Canadian sprint canoeist and sprint kayaker who competed from the late 1940s to the late 1950s.Bert was a founding member of the Toronto Island Canoe Club. Competing in three Summer Olympics, he earned his best finish of fifth in the C-2 10000 m event at London in 1948. Bert's partner was Bill Stevenson.

Oldershaw was inducted into the Canadian Olympic Hall of Fame in 2004 in both athlete and builder categories.

He is a father of Dean Oldershaw, Reed Oldershaw and Scott Oldershaw and grandfather of Mark Oldershaw, all of whom competed for Canada in the Olympics. Mark Oldershaw won a bronze medal for Canada at the 2012 Olympic Games in London, 64 years after his grandfather Bert competed there.

References
 
 Sports-reference.com profile

1921 births
2006 deaths
Canadian male canoeists
Canoeists at the 1948 Summer Olympics
Canoeists at the 1952 Summer Olympics
Canoeists at the 1956 Summer Olympics
Olympic canoeists of Canada
Canoeists from Toronto